Live 2001–2002 World Tour is the first DVD by Italian singer Laura Pausini. It contains footage recorded at the Mediolanum Forum di Milano on 2 December 2001. The album supports Pausini's third world tour.

Track listing 
Live

Bonus tracks

Certifications

References 

Laura Pausini live albums
2001 live albums